"Beer Can't Fix" is a song recorded by American country music singer-songwriters Thomas Rhett and Jon Pardi. It was released to country radio on January 6, 2020 as the third single from Rhett's fourth studio album Center Point Road (2019). The song's thesis is that, regardless of the nature of one's life problems, beer is always the answer. Rhett wrote the song with Julian Bunetta, Ryan Tedder, and Zach Skelton.

Music video
Released in March 2020, the song's music video was directed by Shaun Silva. It features the two singers performing the song together in Key West, Florida.

Commercial performance
"Beer Can't Fix" became Rhett's fifteenth (and ninth consecutive) number-one hit and Pardi's fourth on the Billboard Country Airplay chart dated May 16, 2020. It has reached number six on the Hot Country Songs chart. It has also reached number 36 on the Hot 100, giving Rhett his eighth top 40 hit and Pardi his second on that chart. The song achieved similar prominence in Canada, giving Rhett his twelfth (and ninth consecutive) number-one hit and Pardi his fourth on the Canada Country chart. It also reached number 45 on the Canadian Hot 100 chart.

Charts

Weekly charts

Year-end charts

Certifications

References

2020 songs
2020 singles
Thomas Rhett songs
Jon Pardi songs
Male vocal duets
Big Machine Records singles
Song recordings produced by Dann Huff
Songs written by Thomas Rhett
Songs written by Ryan Tedder
Songs written by Julian Bunetta
Songs written by Zach Skelton